Georgi Rakovski Street, usually called with its old name Rakovska, is an important street in the capital of Bulgaria, Sofia, located in the central area of the city. It is named after the famous Bulgarian revolutionary Georgi Sava Rakovski. It lies between the Slivnitsa Boulevard to the north and Evlogi Georgiev Boulevard to the south.

The street passes along some of Sofia's major landmarks such as the Alexander Nevsky Cathedral, Central Military Club and between the Slaveykov Square and Knyaz Aleksandar Dondukov Boulevard are located many of the theatres in Sofia and it is nicknamed the Theatre Street or Sofia's Broadway:

Municipal Theatre Revival
Aleko Konstantinov Satirical Theatre
Funny Theatre
Capital Puppet Theatre
Ivan Vazov National Theatre
Theatre 199
Theatre Tear and Laugh
Bulgarian Army Theatre
National Opera and Ballet

There are several ministries along the street or very close to it — the Ministry of Economics and Energetics and the Ministry of Finance.

Gallery

References

Streets in Sofia